The 1960–61 La Liga was the 30th season since its establishment. The season started on September 11, 1960, and finished on April 30, 1961.

Real Madrid won their seventh title.

Team locations

League table

Results

Relegation play-offs

|}

Pichichi Trophy

External links
 
 Official LFP Site

1960 1961
1960–61 in Spanish football leagues
Spain